Christin Senkel (born 31 August 1987) is a German bobsledder who has competed since 2008. Her best World Cup finish was third in the two-woman event at Königssee in January 2010.

Senkel also finished seventh in the team event at the FIBT World Championships 2009 in Lake Placid, New York.

She finished fourth in the two-woman event at the 2010 Winter Olympics in Vancouver.

References

External links 

 
 
 

1987 births
Bobsledders at the 2010 Winter Olympics
Bobsledders at the 2014 Winter Olympics
German female bobsledders
Living people
Olympic bobsledders of Germany
21st-century German women